Stormy is the forty-eighth studio album by American musician Hank Williams Jr. It was released on August 31, 1999 on the Curb Records label.

Track listing
 "They All Want to Go Wild (And I Want to Go Home)" – 3:11
 "I'd Love to Knock the Hell Out of You" – 3:06
 "Gibbonsville Gold" – 4:59
 "Where Would We Be Without Yankees" – 3:20
 "Naked Women and Beer" – 4:02
 "I Like It When It's Stormy" – 3:47
 "Southern Thunder" – 4:59
 "Hank Hill Is the King" – 2:45
 "All Jokes Aside" – 4:06
 "Sometimes I Feel Like Joe Montana" – 4:01

Personnel
Eddie Bayers – drums, percussion
Mike Chapman – bass guitar
J.T. Corenflos – 7-string acoustic guitar, acoustic guitar
Dan Dugmore – pedal steel guitar
Stuart Duncan – fiddle
Paul Franklin – pedal steel guitar
Kenny Greenberg – electric guitar
John Hobbs – keyboards, piano
Jim Horn – saxophone
Bill Hullett – 7-string acoustic guitar, acoustic guitar
Michael Landau – 7-string electric guitar, electric guitar
Brent Mason – 7-string electric guitar, electric guitar
Greg Morrow – drums, percussion
Michael Rhodes – bass guitar
Mike Rojas – keyboards, piano
Brent Rowan – 7-string electric guitar, electric guitar
John Wesley Ryles – background vocals
Michael Spriggs – acoustic guitar
Neil Thrasher – background vocals
Hank Williams Jr. – lead vocals
Dennis Wilson – background vocals
Glenn Worf – bass guitar
Curtis Young – background vocals

Chart performance

External links
 Hank Williams Jr's Official Website
 Record Label

1999 albums
Hank Williams Jr. albums
Curb Records albums